Rosanna may refer to:

 Rosanna (given name)
 "Rosanna" (song), a 1982 song by Toto
 Rosanna (film), a 1953 Mexican film
 Rosanna, Victoria, a suburb of Melbourne
 Rosanna railway station
 Rosanna, a community in the township of Norwich, Ontario, Canada
 , a river in Tyrol, Austria; see Sanna (Inn)
 Rosanna, a New Zealand Company ship that in 1826 explored suitable sites for settlements in New Zealand

See also
 Rosana (disambiguation)
 Rossana (disambiguation)
 Roseanna (disambiguation)
 Roseanne (name)